Thaumiers is a commune in the Cher department in the Centre-Val de Loire region of France.

Geography
The river  Auron forms the western and southern boundaries of the commune.

Population

Sights
 The eighteenth-century chateau of Thaumiers.
 The church of St. Saturnin, dating from the twelfth century.
 Some Roman remains: walls, tombs, vases, sculptures and an aqueduct.
 The fifteenth-century chateau of La Forêt.
 Ruins of the priory of Grandmont at Fontguédon.

See also
Communes of the Cher department

References

External links

Annuaire Mairie website 

Communes of Cher (department)